Manel Guillen I Sola (born 19 May 1967) is a Spanish businessman, lawyer and activist investor.

Manel Guillen received a J.D in Law from the Law School of the University of Barcelona in 1991 and an MBA from the IESE Business School, University of Navarra in 1995. He is an active member of the Il•lustre Col•legi d'Advocats de Barcelona, member of the Loan Syndication and Trading Association, the Turnaround Management Association and a member of the Cercle d'Economia de Barcelona.

Guillen is the founder of the investment company Mediterranean Capital Management in 2005, acting as chief executive officer (CEO) since its creation. Currently, based in Barcelona and Madrid, Spain, he has developed his professional career in various senior management positions as CEO in several remarkable companies in Spain, the United States, Brazil, Mexico, Argentina, Iran, Germany, Austria and the United Kingdom.

Professional career 
He developed his professional career in the German media corporation Bertelsmann Group, as sales and marketing deputy director in the book company Círculo de Lectores, a reference in the Spanish cultural world. In 1997, he became the managing director of Bertelsmann Online in Spain and Latin America, a joint venture created by Planeta Corporación and Bertelsmann Group, based in New York City, United States, and investment activities in all major Latin American countries. In 1999, he was appointed chief operating officer (COO) of Telefónica B2B Construction for Spain and Latin America in Telefónica, the main Spanish telecommunications provider and one of the largest telecoms companies in the world. He was also the CEO of BravoSolution España, part of the Italian multinational Italcementi Group.

In 2005, he founded the investment company Mediterranean Capital Management as its CEO. Based in Barcelona, the company is an active investor in the distressed debt market in Spain and Latin America, focusing its target investments in the distressed mortgage market and high yield corporate debt. With cumulative assets under management in excess of 500 M €, throughout his career he has lived and worked in several countries, such as Spain, United States, Brazil, Mexico, Argentina, Iran, Germany, Austria and the UK.

Non-business activities 
Guillen's career is also linked to Spanish basketball. He is a former player and professional basketball referee of Basketball Clubs Association (ACB), the men's professional basketball league in Spain. He has been a referee and executive member of the ACB, from 2001 to 2004 as chairman of the referees' committee and the referees' director of the ACB.

References

External links 
 Press article about on-line bookshops talking as Bertelsmann Online CEO
 Press article about the largest Spanish online bookshop and its CEO, Manel Guillen
 Official profile page as a ACB referee
 Interview on the Spanish basketball referees web Silbanding (in Spanish)
 Press article about non-verbal communication in refereeing as Chairman of the Referees Committee
 Personal home page of Manel Guillen
 Mediterranean Capital Management website

1967 births
Living people
Spanish businesspeople
20th-century Spanish lawyers